Joseph M. Polisena (born June 27, 1954) is an American politician from Rhode Island. He served in the Rhode Island Senate from 1993 to 1999 and again from 2001 to 2007. He is currently mayor of the Town of Johnston, having been elected in 2006, and sworn into office in January 2007. He is a Democrat.

Early life and education

Polisena was born to Julia Marie and Joseph Anthony Polisena on June 27, 1954. He graduated from Johnston High School in Johnston, Rhode Island in 1972. In 1985, Polisena graduated from the Community College of Rhode Island with an associate degree in nursing. In 1988, he earned a Bachelor of Arts in health services from Roger Williams University in Bristol.

In 1998, he completed a Master of Education through Cambridge College.

Career

He was employed by the Community College of Rhode Island as a registered nurse and assistant professor. He also worked as a nurse at the Our Lady of Fatima Hospital. He worked as a firefighter for the Johnston Fire Department.

Rhode Island Senate
He served a total of twelve years in the Rhode Island Senate, from 1993 to 1999 and from 2001 to 2007. He served as Deputy Majority Leader. He served on a state commission studying improvements to the state fire code following a fatal 2003 fire, and he sponsored a 2005 bill to clarify and strengthen the state's fire code.

Mayor of Johnston
Polisena serves on the Rhode Island Municipal Pension Board along with Mayor Angel Taveras of Providence. He has been an outspoken proponent of pension reform throughout the state. He has proposed a plan to freeze cost of living adjustments (COLAs) in retirees' pensions. Polisena has also been a strong supporter of Governor Lincoln Chafee's Municipal Relief Package for the cities and towns of Rhode Island. Polisena is not seeking reelection in 2022, and he endorsed his son, Town Council Vice President Joseph Polisena Jr.

Personal life
He is married to Lucille "Lucy" Polisena. His son, Joseph Polisena, Jr., is Polisena's campaign manager.

References

|-

|-

|-

Living people
1954 births
Democratic Party Rhode Island state senators
Mayors of places in Rhode Island
People from Johnston, Rhode Island
Roger Williams University alumni
Cambridge College alumni
Community College of Rhode Island alumni